The women's 4 × 400 metres relay event at the 2010 Asian Games was held at the Aoti Main Stadium, Guangzhou, China on 26 November.

Schedule
All times are China Standard Time (UTC+08:00)

Records

Results

References
Results

Athletics at the 2010 Asian Games
2010